Sumpango may refer to:

 Sumpango, Sacatepéquez
 Sumpango River

fr:Sumpango